William Henry Walker (29 October 1897 – 28 November 1964) was a prominent English footballer of the 1920s and 1930s. He is considered by many to be one of the greatest footballers to ever play for Aston Villa and England. As a manager he won the FA Cup with each of Sheffield Wednesday and Nottingham Forest, some 24 years apart, a record which stands to this day.

Early life
Billy Walker was born in Wednesbury, Staffordshire. His father George Walker had played professional football for Wolves and Crystal Palace. His teenage years saw him play for a number of football clubs at junior level, starting at Hednesford Town in 1912. He went onto play for Fallings Heath, Darlaston, Wednesbury Old Park and Wednesbury Old Athletic. In 1915 he was signed by Aston Villa on a part-time contract, signing professional forms after the first world war in May 1919.

Playing career
Walker made his senior debut in January 1920 in the FA Cup, scoring twice as Villa won 2-1 in the first round against non-league side Queens Park Rangers. He played in five more FA Cup games, scoring another three, helping Aston Villa reach the FA Cup Final, against second division Huddersfield Town. An extra time winner at Stamford Bridge by Billy Kirton saw Walker become an FA Cup winner in his debut season. Walker also scored 8 league goals in 15 matches at the back end of the 1919-20 season, including a hat-trick against Newcastle United, as Villa ended the first season after the first world war in ninth place.

On the opening day of the 1920-21 season he scored 4 goals as Villa beat Arsenal 5-0. In November 1921, Walker became the first player to score a hat-trick of penalty kicks in a first division match, the second ever after William McAulay for Walsall in 1900, doing so in a 7–1 win against Bradford City. Walker is one of ten players to score this rare hat-trick in a league game – five more in cup games – only matched later in the top flight by Charlie Mitten (Man Utd 1950) and Ken Barnes (Man City 1957). Walker would score 26 goals this season which would be his best in the league and also 4 in the FA Cup. He scored over 20 league goals in each of the next two seasons also.

The 1923-24 season saw Villa again reach the FA Cup final, Walker scoring 3 in 6 games, but disappointment this time as they lost 2-0 to Newcastle United at Wembley. Walker scored 21 goals in the 1925-26 season, the fourth and final time he would score over twenty league goals. He became Aston Villa’s captain in 1926, leading the team for five years before handing it over to Alec Talbot in 1931. He scored 10 in 1927-28 but the next season saw him net 19 times in 36 league appearances. The following season he failed to reach double figures, scoring only 8 times.

The 1930-31 season saw Walker come close to leading Aston Villa becoming English champions, finishing second in the league, scoring a record total of goals, but losing out to a tighter Arsenal defence. Villa scored 128 goals, Arsenal scored 127 but Villa conceded 78. Costly away defeats left the Villains seven points adrift of the Gunners. 33 year old Walker contributed with 15 goals that season, adding to the 49 scored by Pongo Waring and Eric Houghton’s 30. Walker again came close to a league title with Villa, again finishing second to Arsenal, this time by four points in 1932-33. Away form the difference again as Villa managed only twenty points and thirty two goals away from Villa Park, from their twenty one matches. That season would be Walkers last; he had scored 5 goals in 30 league games. He played in five matches the next season before deciding to retire in September 1933 and by December that year had become manager of Sheffield Wednesday.

A one-club man, Walker made 531 appearances for Villa, scoring 244 goals between 1920 and 1934. He scored 214 goals in 478 matches in the league, that ranks him 17th in the all time top flight league scorers in England. He finished his league career only a goal behind Harry Hampton (215), however still to this day; he is Aston Villa's all-time top goalscorer, beating Hampton’s 242.

Walker was capped 18 times by England, scoring nine goals. He scored on his debut as England beat Ireland 2-0 at Roker Park, Sunderland in October 1920. He has the distinction of scoring England's first ever goal at Wembley, although he wasn’t the first Englishman to score that day. Scotland were the first visitors for an international match at Wembley on 12 April 1924, and led at half time through an Eddie Taylor own goal. The ball hitting the keeper after rebounding off the post following a Billy Cowan shot. Walker equalised on the hour mark for a 1-1 draw. Five of his goals came in the British Home Championship, with two braces in friendly matches making up his tally. In the friendly against Belgium in December 1924 at The Hawthorns, Walker missed a penalty after fifteen minutes, but scored twice in the second half. His final cap came nearly six years after earning his 17th, when he was made captain for a friendly in December 1932, against Austria which England won 4-3. He became the second Aston Villa player to captain England, after Howard Spencer.

Billy Walker was Villa's talisman throughout the 1920s and into the 1930s, netting double figures in 12 consecutive seasons from 1919–20. Full-back Tommy Smart is said to have once been asked: "What's the team for the match, Tommy?". "Oh, Billy Walker and ten others!" was the reply.

In March 2003, nearly 40 years after his death, he was named by BBC Sport as the former player Aston Villa needed in their modern-day team – who were struggling for goals that season and narrowly avoided relegation from the FA Premier League.

Managerial career

Sheffield Wednesday
Walker became manager of Sheffield Wednesday in December 1933, and he successfully steered them away from relegation. In 1935 he led them to an FA Cup victory, but Wednesday were relegated two years later and Walker resigned in November 1937.

Chelmsford City
On 24 January 1938, Walker was appointed secretary-manager of newly formed club Chelmsford City. Walker's first signings as Chelmsford manager included former England international Eric Keen, Ireland international Jackie Coulter and Jack Palethorpe, whom he had managed at Sheffield Wednesday. On 20 October 1938, Walker resigned from Chelmsford due to conflict with Chelmsford's directors over transfers. Walker had intended to sign a player from Plymouth Argyle for free, before discovering a £500 fee was demanded, believing "that money was going to take a lot of finding" from the club.

Nottingham Forest
Walker managed Nottingham Forest from 1939 to 1960, bringing promotion to the First Division in 1956–57 and an FA Cup final triumph two years later, beating former team Aston Villa in the semi-finals and becoming the only manager to win the trophy both before and after the Second World War. He retired in 1960.

Death
Walker died on 28 November 1964 in Saxondale Hospital, Radcliffe-on-Trent, near Nottingham, after a long illness. Another former Sheffield Wednesday manager, Jimmy McMullan, died on the same day.

Career statistics

Honours

Player
Aston Villa
 FA Cup: 1919–20; runner-up: 1923–24
 Football League First Division runner-up: 1930–31, 1932–33

Manager
Sheffield Wednesday
 FA Cup: 1934–35
 FA Charity Shield: 1935 

Nottingham Forest
 FA Cup: 1958–59
 Football League Third Division South: 1950–51
 Football League Second Division runner-up: 1956–57
 FA Charity Shield runner-up: 1959

Notes

References

1897 births
1964 deaths
Sportspeople from Wednesbury
English footballers
England international footballers
Association football forwards
Aston Villa F.C. players
English Football League players
English Football League representative players
English football managers
Nottingham Forest F.C. managers
Sheffield Wednesday F.C. managers
Chelmsford City F.C. managers
English Football League managers
Outfield association footballers who played in goal
FA Cup Final players